Simon II of Clermont-Nesle (c. 1210–1285/86) was Seigneur (Lord) of Ailly, Maulette and Nesle (in Picardy)

Biography 
Simon was the eldest son Raoul I of Clermont-Nesle, Seigneur of Ailly, Maulette, and Gertrude of Nesle. He was a counsellor of King Louis IX of France, especially in areas of justice. Jointly with Matthew of Vendôme, Simon was the regent of the kingdom in 1270–71 when Louis and his son Philip were away on the Eighth Crusade, using the title "lieutenant". In the process of canonisation of king Louis in 1283, he was one of those bearing witness.

Simon was also a tutor of the children of the king, appointed by Philip III.

Simon is accounted of the foundation of Hôtel de Nesle, to accommodate nobility in Paris, instead of their first Hôtel de Nesle, that was ceded to King Louis IX, and the construction was enabled through the prominent positions of his sons Raoul and Guy, and their wealth. The hotel was connected to Tour de Nesle, and eventually sold to King Philip IV of France in 1314.

Marriage and issue 
In 1242 Simon married Adele of Montfort, daughter of Amaury de Montfort, Count of Montfort-l'Amaury and Constable of France. Their children were:
 Raoul II/III of Clermont (c. 1245–1302), Seigneur of Nesle , Viscount of Châteaudun, Grand Chamberlain of France and Constable of France. He fought in the Franco-Flemish War (1297–1305) and was killed in the Battle of the Golden Spurs.
 Simon II of Clermont-Nesle (d. 22 December 1312 ?), bishop of Noyon and bishop-count of Beauvais (1301–c. 1312). He was one of few bishops that supported King Philip IV of France against Pope Boniface VIII.
 Amaury, a cleric
 Guy I of Clermont, Seigneur of Breteuil, Ailly and Maulette, appointed to Marshal of France, fighting in the Franco-Flemish War (1297–1305) and was killed in the Battle of the Golden Spurs.
 Elizabeth

See also 
 List of Counts of Soissons
 List of Counts of Clermont-en-Beauvaisis

References

Sources 

12th-century births
Year of birth uncertain
1286 deaths
13th-century French people
Christians of the Crusades
People from Picardy
House of Clermont-Nesle
Medieval French nobility
Lords of France
Regents of France